The Carlsberg papyrus is an ancient Egyptian medical papyrus written in hieratic. The recto concerns eye diseases and the verso deals with birth prognoses (how to determine whether a woman is pregnant; how to determine the sex of the child). The recto text dates to the 18th Dynasty (c. 1500 BCE), while the verso was recorded several generations later (c. 1400 BCE). The papyrus is one of very few medical texts surviving from pharaonic Egypt.

The verso was published in 1939 by Erik Iversen. The recto remains unpublished.

See also

List of ancient Egyptian papyri
History of medicine
Papyrology

References

Egyptology
Ancient Egyptian medical works
Egyptian papyri